Brain Drill was an American technical death metal band formed in 2005 from Ben Lomond, California founded by guitarist and songwriter Dylan Ruskin. They released 2 albums while signed to Metal Blade Records and self released their final third album titled Boundless Obscenity.

History

Formation and The Parasites (2005–2006) 
Brain Drill was founded in 2005; originally meant to be a side project by guitarist Dylan Ruskin after parting from his main band Burn at the Stake. Ruskin began searching for a drummer, eventually finding and hiring on as a session drummer Marco Pitruzella (former drummer of death metal groups, Vile, Vital Remains, The Faceless, and other extreme metal bands). After a few months of jam sessions, vocalist Steve Rathjen joined the band. The trio entered Castle Ultimate Studios with producer Zack Ohren and recorded their six-track EP, dubbed The Parasites, during March and May 2006. Soon after the recording, Rathjen left the band and was replaced by former Dead Syndicate singer, Andre Cornejo. Former Vile bassist Jeff Hughell was added to the band as the new and permanent member. Rathjen then returned to Brain Drill as vocalist again.

Apocalyptic Feasting (2007–2009) 
In a 2007 interview, Cannibal Corpse's bassist, Alex Webster recommended Brain Drill to Metal Blade Records, who signed the band later that year. The group again entered at Castle Ultimate Studios with producer Zack Ohren; this time to work on their debut full-length, recorded during August 2007. Brain Drill's follow-up to their 2006 EP, Apocalyptic Feasting, was released on February 5, 2008 by Metal Blade.

Shortly after the release of Apocalyptic Feasting, both members Marco Pitruzzella and Jeff Hughell left the band due to touring complications. Based on a statement from Dylan Ruskin that was posted on the group's Myspace profile, it appeared that Brain Drill had split up. Soon after, the rumors were denied, and the band started looking for a new drummer and bassist.

Quantum Catastrophe, Boundless Obscenity and breakup (2009–2019)
Brain Drill entered Castle Ultimate studios with Zack Ohren in December 2009 to record their second album through Metal Blade Records. It was titled Quantum Catastrophe and was released on May 11, 2010. "Monumental Failure" premiered as streaming media prior to the album's release. A new song, "Beyond Bludgeoned", was released from the new record as the date grew nearer. A music video was later created for the song and is featured on Comcast on-demand.

In July 2016, vocalist Steve Rathjen and drummer Ron Casey left the band and were then later replaced by Travis Morgan and Alex Bent respectively. Brain Drill then entered Castle Ultimate Studios and self-released their third album titled Boundless Obscenity on July 2, 2016.

On September 10, 2019, it was announced the band had broken up.

Members 
Final lineup
 Dylan Ruskin – guitars , bass 
 Alex Bent – drums 
 Travis Morgan – vocals 

Former members
 Marco Pitruzzella – drums 
 Steve Rathjen – vocals 
 Andre Cornejo – vocals 
 Jeff Hughell – bass 
 Ivan Munguia – bass 
 Joe Bondra – drums 
 Ron Casey – drums

Timeline

Discography 
Studio albums
 Apocalyptic Feasting (2008)
 Quantum Catastrophe (2010)
 Boundless Obscenity (2016)
EPs
 The Parasites (2006)

References

External links
 Brain Drill at Metal Blade Records
 

Death metal musical groups from California
Musical groups established in 2005
American technical death metal musical groups
American grindcore musical groups
Metal Blade Records artists
Musical quartets
Musical groups disestablished in 2019